Langley (also known as Lindon) is an unincorporated community in Pike County, Arkansas, United States. It is about 42 miles southeast of Mena, Arkansas, and is served by Arkansas Highway 84 (east-west) and Arkansas Highway 369 (north-south).

References

Unincorporated communities in Arkansas
Unincorporated communities in Pike County, Arkansas